Randolph Marmaduke "Med" Medley (September 22, 1898 – September 30, 1979) was an American football, basketball, and baseball coach and college athletics administrator.  He served as the head football coach at McMurry University in Abilene, Texas from 1923 to 1938 and at Southwestern University in Georgetown, Texas from 1939 to 1947 and again in 1950, compiling a career college football record of 111–104–24.  Medley was also the head basketball coach at McMurry from 1923 to 1939 and at Southwestern from 1939 to 1947 and again from 1951 to 1958, tallying a career college basketball mark of 206–212.  He was the head baseball coach at Southwestern from 1951 to 1958.

Head coaching record

Football

References

External links
 

1898 births
1979 deaths
Basketball coaches from Missouri
McMurry War Hawks football coaches
McMurry War Hawks men's basketball coaches
Southwestern Pirates athletic directors
Southwestern Pirates baseball coaches
Southwestern Pirates football coaches
Southwestern Pirates men's basketball coaches
People from Audrain County, Missouri